Kask is an Estonian surname meaning "birch". Notable people with the surname include:

Aleksander Kask (1885–1950), Estonian politician
Aleksander Kask (1902–1965), Estonian weightlifter
Arnold Kask (1902–1994), Estonian linguist, philologist and professor
Herman Kask (died 1918), Estonian politician
Janne Kask, former singer of the Swedish band Brainpool
Jana Kask (born 1991), Estonian singer and the winner of Eesti otsib superstaari (Estonian version of Pop Idol) 2008
Oskar Kask (1898–1942), Estonian politician
Peet Kask (born 1948), Estonian politician
Rein Kask (born 1947), Estonian politician
Risto Kask (born 1985), Estonian civil servant and politician
Teet Kask (born 1968), Estonian ballet dancer and choreographer
Tõnis Kask (1929–2016), Estonian director

See also
Kõiv, another Estonian surname meaning birch

Estonian-language surnames